is a Japanese anime television series animated by J.C.Staff which aired on TV Tokyo from January to March 2006. The main character is 2nd Lieutenant Uchida Kazuhiro, a helicopter pilot in a search and rescue wing of the Japan Air Self Defense Force (JASDF).  The anime is a part of the Rescue Wings media franchise produced by Bandai Visual which also includes a live-action film released in 2008, where the main character is a female pilot played by Yuko Takayama, as well as two manga series with different stories focusing on search and rescue squads and personnel.

The real life JASDF Komatsu Air Base hosts a search and rescue wing in addition to two fighter wings with F-15J's and T-4's as portrayed in the anime.  JDS Haruna (DDH-141), on which Hongou lands on to refuel in Episode 3, is a real ship of the JMSDF.

Synopsis
Uchida Kazuhiro joined the JASDF hoping to fly fighter jets, however midway through the pilot training program he was transferred to the rescue helicopter course and was eventually deployed to the Komatsu Rescue Squad as a SAR helicopter pilot. Initially depressed at his assignment, Uchida's experiences eventually cause him to change his mind.

Episodes

「はじめての仕事」(The First Job)
「困難な仕事」(A Difficult Job)
「苦しい仕事」(A Painful Job)
「大切な人」(Precious One)
「必要なこと」(Necessity)
「Bright Side of Life 前編」(Bright Side of Life, Part I)
「Bright Side of Life 後編」(Bright Side of Life, Part II)
「少年の旅路 前編」(A Boy's Journey, Part I)
「少年の旅路 後編」(A Boy's Journey, Part II)
「パーティー」(Party)
「ビバーク」(Bivouac)
「レスキュー」(Rescue)
「最後の仕事」(A Last Job)(Final)(DVD Release)

Cast
Hasegawa Megumi: Noto Mamiko
Hirata Kazuhiko: Ii Atsushi
Hongo Shujiro: Unshō Ishizuka
Kosaka Takashi: Shimura Tomoyuki
Motomura: Shōzō Iizuka
Murakami Ryunosuke: Hoshino Mitsuaki
Nihonmatsu Daigo: Masaya Onosaka
Nishida Kazumi: Kasahara Rumi
Ogata: Shinya Fukumatsu
Shaura Ryoko: Ai Sato
Uchida Kazuhiro: Miyazaki Issei
Uchida Misae:	Takamura Hisae
Yumi:	Makiko Ōmoto

Production
The Blu-Ray version was released in Japan on November 22, 2018. The release was timed to celebrate the 60th anniversary of the JASDF's Air Rescue Wing. In 2017, scholar Takayoshi Yamamura noted that anime was produced in the collaboration with the JASDF.

References

External links
 Official webpage (Japanese)
 
 

Action anime and manga
Anime with original screenplays
Aviation television series
Aviation comics
Drama anime and manga
J.C.Staff
Japan Self-Defense Forces in fiction
Japanese drama films
Japanese action films